Wanquetin is a commune in the Pas-de-Calais department in the Hauts-de-France region of France.

Geography

Population

Places of interest
 The church of St. Martin, dating from the eighteenth century
 A nineteenth-century Protestant church
 The Commonwealth War Graves Commission cemeteries

See also
Communes of the Pas-de-Calais department

References

External links

 The CWGC communal cemetery
 The CWGC communal cemetery extension
 Official website 

Communes of Pas-de-Calais